Luis César Amadori (28 May 1902 in Pescara, Abruzzi, Italy – 5 June 1977 in Buenos Aires) was an Italian - Argentine film director and screenwriter and one of the most influential directors in the Cinema of Argentina of the classic era. He directed over 60 films between 1936 and 1967, writing the scripts to over 50 pictures.

He directed films such as Apasionadamente (1944), the critically acclaimed  Albéniz (1947) and Alma fuerte (1949).

Filmography 
New Port (1936)
 El pobre Pérez (1937)
 El canillita y la dama (1938)
 Meastro Levita (1938)
Honeysuckle (1938)
 Palabra de honor (1939)
 Caminito de Gloria (1939)
 El Haragán de la familia (1940)
Educating Niní (1940)
 Napoleón (1941)
The Song of the Suburbs  (1941)
Girls Orchestra (1941)
 Soñar no cuesta nada (1941)
 El tercer beso (1942)
 El profesor Cero (1942)
 Bajó un ángel del cielo (1942)
 La mentirosa (1942)
 Ciaro de luna (1942)
Son cartas de amor (1943)
 Luisito (1943)
Carmen (1943)
 Apasionadamente (1944)
Two Angels and a Sinner (1945)
 Madame Sans-Gêne (1945)
Saint Candida (1945)
Mosquita muerta (1946)
 Albéniz (1947)
Una mujer sin cabeza (1947)
 Dios se lo pague (1948)
 Una noche en el Ta-Ba-Rín  (1949)
 Don Juan Tenorio (1949)
 Juan Globo (1949)
 Almafuerte (1949)
 Historia de una passion (1950)
 Nacha Regules (1950)
 Pecado (1951)
María Montecristo (1951)
 Me casé con una estrella (1951)
 Eva Perón inmortal  (1952)
La de los ojos color del tiempo (1952)
La pasión desnuda (1953)
El Grito sagrado (1954)
Caídos en el infierno (1954)
El barro humano (1955)
El amor nunca muere (1955)
Amor prohibido (1958)
The Violet Seller (1958)
Una muchachita de Valladolid (1958)
Una Gran señora (1959)
Where Are You Going, Alfonso XII? (1959)
Un trono para Cristy (1960)
Mi último tango (1960)
Alerta en el cielo (1961)
Pecado de amor (1961)
La Casta Susana (1963)
El señor de La Salle (1964)
 Como dos gotas de agua (1964)
 Más bonita que ninguna (1965)
 Acompáñame (1966)
 Amor en el aire (1967)
 Un novio para dos hermanas (1967)
Good Morning, Little Countess (1967)
Cristina Guzmán (1968)

Notes 
 Luis Trelles Plazaola: South American Cinema: Dictionary of Film Makers. La Editorial UPR 1989, p. 5
 Néstor Pinsón: Luis César Amadori at todotango.com

External links 
 

1902 births
1977 deaths
Argentine film directors
Argentine screenwriters
Argentine male writers
Italian emigrants to Argentina
Italian film directors
20th-century Italian screenwriters
Burials at La Recoleta Cemetery
Italian male screenwriters
20th-century Italian male writers